The 1993 Peru Census was a detailed enumeration of the Peruvian population made on July 11, 1993, by the Instituto Nacional de Estadística e Informática. Its full name in Spanish is IX Censo de Población y IV de Vivienda ("Ninth Population and Fourth Household Census").

The latest census done by the Peruvian Government is the Peru 2007 Census.

Population
According to this census, the total population in Peru is 22,048,356 inhabitants, 50.3% of which (11,091,981) are female and 49.7% (10,956,375) are male.

Departments

Lima Metropolitan Area
The Lima Metropolitan Area consists of the cities of Lima and Callao.

Languages
Spanish is the most spoken language in the country, with 89.5% using it as their first language, while Quechua is spoken at home by 16.5% of the population, 2.3% speak Aymara, 0.7% speak other indigenous languages, and 0.2% speak foreign languages.

Education
The illiteracy rate is 15%.

See also
 Peru Census
 Peru 2005 Census
 Peru 2007 Census

References

Censuses in Peru
Demographics of Peru
Peru
1993 in Peru